American-Jewish comedy is, in part, a continuation of the traditional role of humor in Jewish culture among historical and contemporary American performers. It has appealed to both Jewish and wider mainstream audiences. At various times in American history, the field of comedy has been dominated by Jewish comedians.

History
The Borscht Belt arose in the early 20th century out of the tradition of Yiddish theater, in Jewish resort areas in the Catskill Mountains in New York.  Many of the most famous Jewish comedians of the twentieth century launched their careers there. Many of the comedians gained a wider mainstream audience with the rise of Vaudeville.

Until recent years, most Jewish comedians adopted stage names that did not sound ethnic, as a way of gaining wider acceptance.  Even among those who did not want to be considered Jewish comedians, their experiences as Jews were often included in their humor, including their moral sensibility.

Themes and styles

Some common themes among American Jewish comedians include their heritage as Jews, experience of living between two worlds (ethnic and mainstream), anxiety of living as a minority in America and the foibles of American culture.  Jewish comedy has often featured ridicule and insult jokes, including insulting other minority groups.

Characteristics of comedians include wit, verbal skills, self-mockery, and a "critical edge".

Women in Jewish-American humor
Whereas women had not been prominent in comedic roles in Europe, the changing roles of Jewish women in America allowed for the emergence of a class of female Jewish comedians, who have focused on their perspective as women, often adopting a feminist position.

Representative examples
Following is a partial list of notable Americans for whom Jewishness is relevant to their role as comedians or humorists.

Woody Allen
Eric Andre
Judd Apatow
Roseanne Barr
Todd Barry
Belle Barth
Jack Benny
Gertrude Berg
Milton Berle
Shelley Berman
Sandra Bernhard
Lewis Black
Alex Borstein 
David Brenner
Fanny Brice
Albert Brooks
Mel Brooks
Lenny Bruce
George Burns
Sid Caesar
Emil Cohen
Myron Cohen
David Cross
Billy Crystal
Rodney Dangerfield
Larry David
Fran Drescher
Susie Essman
Wayne Federman
Totie Fields
David Frye
Brad Garrett
Ilana Glazer
Judy Gold
Gilbert Gottfried
Buddy Hackett
Goldie Hawn
Jackie Hoffman
Judy Holliday
Abbi Jacobson
Jay Jason
Madeline Kahn
Andy Kaufman
Danny Kaye
Robert Klein
Harvey Korman
Nick Kroll
Lisa Kron
Tom Lehrer
Wendy Liebman
Jerry Lewis
Richard Lewis
Marc Maron
Groucho Marx and the Marx Brothers
Jackie Mason
Elaine May
Bette Midler
Mike Nichols
Molly Picon
Rain Pryor
Gilda Radner
Carl Reiner
Paul Reubens (Pee-wee Herman)
Don Rickles
Joan Rivers
Seth Rogen
Rita Rudner
Mort Sahl
Andy Samberg
Adam Sandler
Amy Schumer
Jerry Seinfeld
William Shatner 
Allan Sherman
Monroe Silver
Sarah Silverman
Phil Silvers
Jenny Slate
David Steinberg
Howard Stern
Jon Stewart
Ben Stiller
The Three Stooges
Sophie Tucker
Gene Wilder
Henny Youngman
Tiffany Haddish

References

 
.